Chrysosyrphus, the Wrinklehead flies, is a genus of hoverflies in the family Syrphidae. They are native the holarctic region. These flies are small and black. (LBFs, Little Black Flies), The adults feed on nectar and pollen the sources of energy and protein respectively. Larvae are unknown.

Diagnotsics
For terminology see Speight key to genera and glossary
The face of Chrysosyrphus  is entirely black or partly yellow, and is bare medially with either a distinct tubercle clearly separated from the oral margin or is straight with a lower margin that projects. Males with bare holoptic eyes. The face is haired with only a median stripe that is bare. The hairs extend from just below the level of the antenna to the subcranial margin. The face does not have an orbital strip, and the antennae are located above the upper third of the head.. The scutellum is without bristles and has a subscutellar fringe of pile. The apical cross-vein (M1) forms an acute angle with the third vein (R4+5).

Species
C. alaskensis (Shannon, 1922)
C. frontosus (Bigot, 1884)
C. latus (Loew, 1863)
C. montanus Violovitsh, 1978
C. nasuta (Zetterstedt, 1838)
C. niger (Zetterstedt, 1843)
C. nigripennis (Williston, 1882)
C. tundrarum Violovitsh, 1978

References

Hoverfly genera
Eristalinae